

Events
 Máeleoin Bódur Ó Maolconaire becomes Ollamh Síl Muireadaigh

Births

Deaths
 December 25 — Folquet de Marselha (born 1150), an Occitan troubadour
 Dúinnín Ó Maolconaire (born unknown), the first recorded Ollamh Síl Muireadaigh

13th-century poetry
Poetry